Job: A Comedy of Justice is a novel by Robert A. Heinlein published in 1984. The title is a reference to the biblical Book of Job and James Branch Cabell's book Jurgen, A Comedy of Justice. It won the Locus Award for Best Fantasy Novel in 1985 and was nominated for the Nebula Award for Best Novel in 1984, and the Hugo Award for Best Novel in 1985.

Plot summary
The story examines religion through the eyes of Alex, a Christian political activist who is corrupted by Margrethe, a Danish Norse cruise ship hostess—and who loves every minute of it. Enduring a shipwreck, an earthquake, and a series of world-changes brought about by Loki (with Jehovah's permission), Alex and Marga work their way from Mexico back to Kansas as dishwasher and waitress.

Whenever they manage to make some stake, an inconveniently timed change into a new alternate reality throws them off their stride (once, the money they earned is left behind in another reality; in another case, the paper money earned in a Mexico which is an empire is worthless in another Mexico which is a republic). These repeated misfortunes, clearly effected by some malevolent entity, make the hero identify with the Biblical Job.

On the way they unknowingly enjoy the Texas hospitality of Satan himself, but as they near their destination they are separated by the Rapture — Margrethe worships Odin, and pagans do not go to Heaven. Finding that the reward for his faith, eternity as promised in the Book of Revelation, is worthless without her, Alex journeys through timeless space in search of his lost lady, taking him to Hell and beyond.

Heinlein depicts a Heaven ruled by snotty angels and a Hell where everyone has a wonderful, or at least productive, time — with Mary Magdalene shuttling breezily between both places.

The novel is linked to Heinlein's short story They by the term "the Glaroon", and to his earlier novel The Moon Is a Harsh Mistress by referring to the Moon colonies "Luna City" and "Tycho Under".

Throughout the novel, Alex briefly describes the history of his own world, and of some of the worlds he visits. In his own world, William Jennings Bryan was elected US President in 1896, the United States avoided war during the 20th century, and Germany is still a monarchy. John F. Kennedy was never President, as revealed when Alex visits a world where Kennedy served two full terms and is unfamiliar with him. Airship travel was never supplanted by airplane travel, and the television was not invented. Other trivial information about Alex's world and the other worlds he visits is revealed as the novel goes along.

Reception
Dave Langford reviewed Job: A Comedy of Justice for White Dwarf #61, and stated that "When blasphemy stops being witty and shocking, it tends to become pointless, like graffiti scrawled on church wall. I didn't dislike this one, but . . . wait for the paperback, eh?"

Awards
Nebula Award nominee, 1984
Hugo Award nominee, 1985
Locus Award for Fantasy Novel, 1985

See also

 Religious ideas in science fiction

References

External links

JOB: A Comedy of Justice at Worlds Without End

1984 American novels
American science fiction novels
Novels by Robert A. Heinlein
1984 science fiction novels
Comic science fiction novels
1984 fantasy novels
Del Rey books
Fiction about God
Fiction about the Devil
Heaven and hell novels
Book of Job
Books with cover art by Michael Whelan